Simone Maria (Arnold) Liebster (born 17 August 1930) was a French victim of Nazi persecution during World War II as a member of Jehovah's Witnesses. Simone was also notable as the author of a book called Facing the lion—memoirs of a young girl In Nazi Europe in which she wrote about her experiences at the hands of the Nazis.

Family 
Liebster was born to Adolphe Arnold and Emma Borot in Husseren-Wesserling, Haut-Rhin. In 1933, the family moved to Mulhouse. She was baptized as a Jehovah's Witness in 1941.

In 1951, she travelled to New York to study at the Watchtower Bible School of Gilead, to become a missionary. She married Max Liebster, another survivor of Nazi persecution in 1956 and "together they have devoted their lives to their ministry and to peace education."

Religious persecution 
In July 1943, Liebster received a letter, from the German government, ordering her to report to the train station. She "was arrested by juvenile authorities, taken to Konstanz, Germany, and put in a Nazi penitentiary home. For nearly two years, Simone was forbidden to talk and was forced to do hard labor. Both her parents by this time had been imprisoned in Nazi camps, and none expected to live to see the family reunited. The end of the war arrived, though, and the Arnolds all returned home and rebuilt their lives."

Filmography 
 Jehovah's Witnesses Stand Firm Against Nazi Assault (1996)
 Taking the Stand: We Have More to Say (2016)
 The Schoolgirl The Nazis and The Purple Triangles (2018)

Reception 
Reviewing Liebster's book, Alone in front of the Lion, philosopher and religious scientist Volker Zotz wrote: "The book as a historical document is significant in at least two ways. Once it provides an insight into the way in which the Nazi system tried to reeducate children. Then it provides a new source to a group of previously rather neglected Nazi victims, the Jehovah's Witnesses. But regardless of what gaps this book of historical research may conclude, it is of the highest interest as a personal testimony.
How a child, under cruel conditions, preserves her inner dignity and her belief in God and the people, even though she knows her father in the concentration camp and her mother, even though she knows that close friends must die as conscientious objectors, is one in many ways challenging reading. The child can withstand the lion, as it feels the cruel Nazi machinery, because religious and ethical values give it an unconditional support."

References

External links 
 Arnold Liebster Foundation
 
 Jehovah Witness Survivor Simone Maria Liebster Testimony in the Visual History Archive of the USC Shoah Foundation
 "Are You Different" An online exhibition about young people in the time of National Socialism of the Federal Foundation for the Murdered Jews of Europe

French Jehovah's Witnesses
Persecution of Jehovah's Witnesses
21st-century French women writers
1930 births
Living people
21st-century biographers
French autobiographers
Women biographers
French expatriates in the United States
French women in World War II
Writers from Mulhouse